Rineloricaria (from the Greek, rhinos meaning nose, and the Latin, lorica meaning cuirass of leather) is a genus of freshwater tropical catfish (order Siluriformes) belonging to the family Loricariidae. They are commonly called whiptail catfish because of the long filament that grows out of the tip of the caudal fin that is characteristic of the genus. With the exception of R. altipinnis from Panama, they  are native to the rivers of northern and central South America. Some species are regularly seen in the aquarium trade.

Taxonomy
This genus was described by Pieter Bleeker in 1862, with R. lima as the type species. This genus is by far one of the most speciose of the subfamily Loricariinae, containing about 30 species. On the other hand, it is one of the least resolved genera. In 2008, 14 new species were added to this genus.

Hemiloricaria, Fonchiiichthys, and Leliella been variably considered synonyms of Rineloricaria; these genera were erected to account for differences in sexually dimorphic traits. However, the traits used to diagnose these genera have been thought to be insufficient.

Species
There are currently 64 recognized species in this genus:
 Rineloricaria aequalicuspis R. E. dos Reis & A. R. Cardoso, 2001
 Rineloricaria altipinnis (Breder, 1925)
 Rineloricaria anhaguapitan Ghazzi, 2008
 Rineloricaria anitae Ghazzi, 2008
 Rineloricaria aurata (Knaack, 2003)
 Rineloricaria baliola M. S. Rodriguez & R. E. dos Reis, 2008
 Rineloricaria beni (N. E. Pearson, 1924)
 Rineloricaria cacerensis (A. Miranda-Ribeiro, 1912)
 Rineloricaria cadeae (R. F. Hensel, 1868)
 Rineloricaria capitonia Ghazzi, 2008
 Rineloricaria caracasensis (Bleeker, 1862)
 Rineloricaria castroi Isbrücker & Nijssen, 1984
 Rineloricaria catamarcensis (C. Berg (es), 1895)
 Rineloricaria cubataonis (Steindachner, 1907)
 Rineloricaria daraha Rapp Py-Daniel & Fichberg, 2008
 Rineloricaria eigenmanni (Pellegrin, 1908)
 Rineloricaria fallax (Steindachner, 1915)
 Rineloricaria felipponei (Fowler, 1943)
 Rineloricaria formosa Isbrücker & Nijssen, 1979
 Rineloricaria hasemani Isbrücker & Nijssen, 1979
 Rineloricaria henselii (Steindachner, 1907)
 Rineloricaria heteroptera Isbrücker & Nijssen, 1976
 Rineloricaria hoehnei (A. Miranda-Ribeiro, 1912)
 Rineloricaria isaaci M. S. Rodriguez & Miquelarena, 2008
 Rineloricaria jaraguensis (Steindachner, 1909)
 Rineloricaria jubata (Boulenger, 1902)
 Rineloricaria jurupari (Londoño & Urbano, 2018)
 Rineloricaria konopickyi (Steindachner, 1879)
 Rineloricaria kronei (A. Miranda-Ribeiro, 1911)
 Rineloricaria lanceolata (Günther, 1868) (Chocolate-colored catfish)
 Rineloricaria langei Ingenito, Ghazzi, Duboc & Abilhoa, 2008
 Rineloricaria latirostris (Boulenger, 1900)
 Rineloricaria lima (Kner, 1853)
 Rineloricaria longicauda R. E. dos Reis, 1983
 Rineloricaria maacki Ingenito, Ghazzi, Duboc & Abilhoa, 2008
 Rineloricaria magdalenae (Steindachner, 1879)
 Rineloricaria malabarbai M. S. Rodriguez & R. E. dos Reis, 2008
 Rineloricaria maquinensis R. E. dos Reis & A. R. Cardoso, 2001
 Rineloricaria melini (O. Schindler, 1959)
 Rineloricaria microlepidogaster (Regan, 1904)
 Rineloricaria microlepidota (Steindachner, 1907)
 Rineloricaria misionera M. S. Rodriguez & Miquelarena, 2005
 Rineloricaria morrowi Fowler, 1940
 Rineloricaria nigricauda (Regan, 1904)
 Rineloricaria osvaldoi Fichberg & Chamon, 2008
 Rineloricaria pareiacantha (Fowler, 1943)
 Rineloricaria parva (Boulenger, 1895)
 Rineloricaria pentamaculata Langeani & R. B. de Araujo, 1994
 Rineloricaria phoxocephala (C. H. Eigenmann & R. S. Eigenmann, 1889)
 Rineloricaria platyura (J. P. Müller & Troschel, 1849)
 Rineloricaria quadrensis R. E. dos Reis, 1983
 Rineloricaria reisi Ghazzi, 2008
 Rineloricaria sanga Ghazzi, 2008
 Rineloricaria setepovos Ghazzi, 2008
 Rineloricaria sneiderni (Fowler, 1944)
 Rineloricaria steindachneri (Regan, 1904)
 Rineloricaria stellata Ghazzi, 2008
 Rineloricaria stewarti (C. H. Eigenmann, 1909)
 Rineloricaria strigilata (R. F. Hensel, 1868)
 Rineloricaria teffeana (Steindachner, 1879)
 Rineloricaria thrissoceps (Fowler, 1943)
 Rineloricaria tropeira Ghazzi, 2008
 Rineloricaria wolfei Fowler, 1940
 Rineloricaria zaina Ghazzi, 2008

Distribution and habitat
The genus is widely distributed on nearly the entire subcontinent, from Costa Rica to Argentina, on both slopes of the Andes. Rineloricaria species are found in a large variety of habitats, including large rivers, streams, and lagoons, associated with bottoms consisting of sand or rocks, sometimes found in marginal vegetation. They are also found to tolerate environments with a wide temperature gradient. Rineloricaria have an adaptive capacity enabling many species to exploit the most varied habitats; some species, such as R. strigilata, have been caught in highly polluted bodies of water and represent some of the main components of the ichthyological diversity in such habitats.

Appearance and anatomy
The average length of a Rineloricaria catfish is about 13 cm (5 in) long. The fish are long, slender, have no visible barbels, an erect dorsal fin, a very thin caudal peduncle, and a narrow face. The coloration of the fishes is usually light brown with darker blotches, and have a dark dorsal fin. They are also covered with bony plates and have a sucker disk mouth, as is common with most fish in the family Loricariidae.

Reproduction
Sexual dimorphism includes hypertrophied development of the odontodes along the sides of the head, on the pectoral spines and rays, and predorsal area of mature males. Several species also show hypertrophied development of the odontodes on the entire caudal peduncle. In males, the pectoral fin spine is often thick, short, and curved when compared to the female. Rineloricaria are cavity brooders. Numerous eggs (often more than 100) are laid attached to one another in single layer masses on the cavity floor, and are brooded by males. Rineloricaria exhibit high levels of karyotypic diversity with chromosome numbers ranging from 36 to 70.

See also
List of freshwater aquarium fish species

References

Loricariini
Fish of South America
Fish of the Amazon basin
Catfish genera
Taxa named by Pieter Bleeker
Freshwater fish genera